Benjamin Earl Davidson (June 14, 1940 – July 2, 2012) was an American football player, a defensive end best known for his play with the Oakland Raiders in the American Football League (AFL). Earlier in his career, he was with the Green Bay Packers and Washington Redskins of the National Football League (NFL). He later worked as an actor.

Early years
Born and raised in Los Angeles, California, Davidson was the son of Avis (née Wheat) and Benjamin Earl Franklin, Senior. He attended Woodrow Wilson High School in the El Sereno neighborhood of Los Angeles, but did not play football in high school; because of his height, basketball and track were more to his liking. While attending junior college at East Los Angeles College, he was spotted by the football coach and asked to join the team. He was subsequently recruited to play at the University of Washington in Seattle in 1959, where he flourished as a member of consecutive Rose Bowl-winning teams under head coach Jim Owens and gained entry into professional football.

Professional career

NFL
Davidson was selected in the fourth round of the 1961 NFL draft by the New York Giants, but was traded in training camp to the Green Bay Packers.

As a rookie, he played mostly special teams for the Packers in 1961, who beat the Giants 37–0 in the championship game, the first of five NFL titles for head coach Vince Lombardi. During training camp in 1962, Davidson was traded to the Washington Redskins for a fifth round draft choice. He played there in 1962 and 1963, until he was waived in September 1964 final cuts after not meeting the team's strict weight guidelines.

AFL
Davidson is best remembered his play with the American Football League Oakland Raiders. Al Davis signed him as a free agent shortly after his release from the Redskins and he thrived as a pass rusher under head coaches Davis, John Rauch, and John Madden. He was an AFL All-Star in 1966, 1967, and 1968.

The Raiders won the AFL championship in 1967 and played in Super Bowl II, but were overmatched by the Green Bay Packers. Oakland advanced to the AFL title games the next two seasons but lost to the New York Jets in 1968 and the Kansas City Chiefs in 1969, the league's last game. A stretched Achilles tendon in 1972 kept him on the sidelines that entire season.

NFL merger and Dawson–Taylor incident
On November 1, 1970, after the AFL-NFL merger, the defending champion Kansas City Chiefs led the Raiders 17–14 late in the fourth quarter. A long run for a first-down by Chiefs quarterback Len Dawson apparently sealed victory for the Chiefs in the final minute when Dawson, as he lay on the ground, was speared by Davidson, who dove into Dawson with his helmet at full running speed, provoking Chiefs' receiver Otis Taylor to attack Davidson. After a bench-clearing brawl, offsetting penalties were called, nullifying the first down under the rules in effect at that time. The Chiefs were obliged to punt, and the Raiders tied the game on a George Blanda field goal with eight seconds to play. Davidson's play not only cost the Chiefs a win, but Oakland won the AFC West with a season record of 8–4–2, while Kansas City finished 7–5–2 and out of the playoffs. After the season, the NFL changed its rules regarding personal fouls, separating those called during a play from those called after it.  In 1976, the NFL further modified its rules, explicitly calling out a late hit such as Davidson's as illegal.

Davidson's hit on Dawson was not an isolated occurrence; Winston Hill, a Jets player of the era, called Davidson "the No. 1 cheap-shot artist" in the league.  A journalist for The New York Times wrote that Davidson "probably was responsible for more late hits than any other player" of his time, and was known for going after the opposing team's quarterback.  Davidson cultivated a persona as a "villain" and embraced this reputation, even wearing a handlebar mustache.

WFL
Three years out of football, Davidson signed with the Portland Storm in early September 1974, already midway through the World Football League's inaugural 1974 season. While with the Storm, he lived in his motor home that he drove up from California. A late season knee injury in early November ended his season and playing career.

Entertainment career
Davidson appeared in a few films including The Black Six, M*A*S*H, and Conan the Barbarian. He portrayed Porter the Bouncer in Behind the Green Door in 1972 and a convict football player in Necessary Roughness in 1991.  Davidson played himself in Miller Lite ads featuring John Madden and Rodney Dangerfield. He also appeared in the short lived 1976 show Ball Four as a minor-league baseball player named Rhino Rhinelander, the 1977 pilot for Lucan and the 1984 TV movie Goldie and the Bears. Davidson also appeared in an episode of the 1970s TV series Happy Days as a lumberjack. He also appeared in the series premiere of Banacek in 1972.

Personal life
Following his rookie season with Green Bay, Davidson took his winner's check ($5,195) from the 1961 NFL title game and bought rental property in Seattle; beginning a lifelong and successful focus on residential real estate. He began 1961 with a Rose Bowl win on January 2 and ended it with an NFL championship on December 31. In between he was wed and celebrated the birth of his first child.

Davidson and fellow Oakland Raider teammate Tom Keating were avid motorcycle riders and completed both a ride from California to the Panama Canal and a four-month,  trip across the United States while with the Raiders.

Davidson died of prostate cancer at age 72.  He was retired and living in San Diego and was survived by his wife Kathy, and daughters Janella, Dana, and Vicky. Coincidentally, Davidson's former Raiders teammate and motorcycle buddy, Tom Keating, died two months after him, also as a result of prostate cancer.

See also
Other American Football League players

References

External links
 
 

1940 births
2012 deaths
American football defensive linemen
Green Bay Packers players
Oakland Raiders players
Portland Storm players
Washington Huskies football players
Washington Redskins players
American Football League All-Star players
Violence in sports
Players of American football from Los Angeles
Deaths from prostate cancer
American Football League players
Woodrow Wilson High School (Los Angeles) alumni